Boy Azooga are a Welsh indie rock group from Cardiff, Wales. Formed in 2017, the group is led by front man Davey Newington (vocals, guitar), who is joined live by band members Dafydd Davies (drums), Sam Barnes (bass), and Dylan Morgan (keyboard).

History
The group have been described as influenced by an eclectic spate of sources, from Run-DMC, to William Onyeabor, to the Beach Boys. The early releases were a result of work between lead singer Davey Newington and hip hop producer Ed Al-Shakarchi (Dr Ed Boogie).

The band name originates from the 1994 comedy film The Little Rascals, which Newington would watch as a child when visiting his grandmother in Scotland.

In 2017 the band made their first festival appearance at Green Man Festival in the Brecon Beacons.

The band toured their debut album in several British towns and cities in June 2018. Later that year they performed at Paradiso in Amsterdam and at the Live at Leeds festival.

Boy Azooga made their television debut in May 2018 on Later... with Jools Holland, alongside fellow Welsh artists Gwenno and Manic Street Preachers. Newington has also appeared on a show hosted by Mike D of the Beastie Boys as well as having their music featured on BBC Radio 1 and BBC Radio 6 Music.

In 2018, the band appeared at The Last Music Bar in Brighton for the 2018 Great Escape Festival, as part of the Horizons Gorwelion project.

In May 2019, the band performed as a warm up act at Cardiff Castle for Noel Gallagher and his act High Flying Birds. His brother Liam has also previously claimed that the band are his "favourite up and coming artist".

Band members 
 Davey Newington – vocals, guitar (2017–present)
 Dafydd Davies – drums (2017–present)
 Sam Barnes – bass (2017–present)
 Dylan Morgan – guitar, keyboard  (2017–present)

Davey Newington
A native of Cardiff, Newington was introduced to music at an early age by his parents, classically trained musicians who met in the BBC National Orchestra of Wales. Newington took up drums at age six, and began songwriting at fourteen.  He also played the timpani, xylophone and sleigh bells in youth orchestras. Although proficient on several instruments, in the early part of his career he mainly played drums.

Before Boy Azooga, Newington was active as a solo artist known as Bongo Fury, and was involved with Charlotte Church's Late Night Pop Dungeon. He decided to sign with label Heavenly Recordings after following the career of King Gizzard & the Lizard Wizard. Label owner Jeff Barrett listened to the track "On the Train to Brighton" while he was travelling to a King Gizzard performance in Brighton, and called Newington immediately to ask him to sign for the label.

Newington began writing his discography at age 19, beginning with Hangover Square from what became their debut album 1 2 Kung Fu! He recorded largely all of 1 2 Kung Fu, except for some string performances by his father on "Jerry", "Hangover Square" and "Breakfast Epiphany II". His father Richard Newington is a violinist with the BBC National Orchestra of Wales and has a wide range of other credits, including appearances on Gruff Rhys' 2018 album, Babelsberg.

Discography

Singles

Albums

References

External links 
 
 Allmusic

Welsh rock music groups
Musical groups established in 2017
British indie rock groups
British blues rock musical groups
Dream pop musical groups
2017 establishments in Wales
Heavenly Recordings artists